Minister of Agriculture is the person in charge of the Ministry of Agriculture and Rural Development of Montenegro. Vladimir Joković is the current Minister of Agriculture and Rural Development, since 28 April 2022.

Ministers of Agriculture, since 2006

References

Government of Montenegro